The World Wide Views projects were started in 2009 by the Danish Board of Technology Foundation to involve citizens in global environmental policy making through deliberation and voting.

Recent decades have shown a growing need for global solutions to global problems. As cross-border environmental challenges have grown in scale, the nations of the world have turned to international organisations in search of a common platform in which to address these problems. One such platform has been the United Nations (UN), institutionalized in the Conventions on Global Warming and on Biodiversity, more specifically the United Nations Framework Convention on Climate Change (UNFCCC) and the Convention on Biological Diversity (CBD).

One of the challenges presented by these international platforms has been, and is, how to involve the citizens of the world in decisions and policies resulting from the Conference of Parties (COP) meetings held regularly and involving political leaders and heads of state of the participating UN member states. As environmental hazards and changes affect us all without regards to our nationality, citizen participation in global policy making is crucial both to every one of us as citizens, and to the nations of the world gathering at COP’s in order to find and commit to sustainable and reasonable solutions.

With its extensive experience in involving citizens in citizen deliberation on a broad range of issues, the Danish Board of Technology Foundation (DBT) has started the World Wide Views projects, organising partner organisations from all over the world in a World Wide Views Alliance with the main purpose of involving citizens in global environmental policy making through deliberation and voting. The aim is to provide ordinary citizens of the world with a direct link to political decision makers, while providing the decision makers with an informed insight into the needs and views of the citizens they are representing, as well as creating public awareness of environmental hazards and challenges.

Method 

The World Wide Views method is built on deliberative and democratic ideals. Each World Wide Views Alliance partner gathers a group of citizens, recruited to represent a broad sample of the partner country’s demographics, at a citizen meeting. Leading up to the meeting, every participant receives a thorough information material, outlining the major themes and problems of the overall issue and written by leading experts in the field. The citizen meeting is divided into a handful of sessions, each session concerning a theme presented in the information material. At the start of the meeting, the participating citizens are placed at round tables, 7-8 persons per table. Each session of the meeting starts by a short introduction movie, outlining the theme’s main problems, again as presented in the information material, followed by a discussion facilitated by a neutral table facilitator (ideally a politician) in which the citizens can share their views and thoughts on the theme, and learn by and with each other. The session is rounded up by a vote, in which each citizen can express his or her view through anonymous votes on prefabricated questions relating to the theme’s problems.

At the end of the meeting, the participating citizens have discussed a handful of themes and voted on these, based on their own thoughts, the information material and videos and their discussion with fellow citizens. The voting results are uploaded to a web tool as they are available at the meeting and are thus instantly available to everyone.

As the meetings planned and executed by each World Wide Views Alliance partner are simultaneous, the web tool makes it possible to view and compare the views of citizens from all over the world as soon as they have voted.

The overall method and training is coordinated and headed by the DBT.

World Wide Views on Global Warming 

The World Wide Views on Global Warming took place in 2009 in relation to the COP15 on Global Warming in Copenhagen. It involved 4000 citizens at citizen meetings in 38 countries around the world.

World Wide Views on Biodiversity 

The World Wide Views on Biodiversity took place in 2012 in relations to the COP11 on Biological Diversity in India, involving 3000 citizens at citizen meetings in 25 countries around the world.

Future World Wide Views projects are being discussed.

References

External links 
 World Wide Views Alliance
 World Wide Views on Biodiversity – Project web page
 World Wide Views on Biodiversity - Video documentary, October 17, 2012
 World Wide Views on Global Warming – Project web page
 World Wide Views on Global Warming - Video documentary, 2010
 The Danish Board of Technology
 United Nations Framework Convention on Climate Change
 Convention on Biological Diversity

Climate change organizations